The following is a list of Cal State Northridge Matadors men's basketball head coaches. There have been seven head coaches of the Matadors in their 65-season history.

Cal State Northridge's current head coach is Trent Johnson. He was hired as the Matadors' full-time head coach in March 2022, after serving as interim coach for the 2021–22 season. Johnson replaced Mark Gottfried, who was placed on administrative leave while the school investigated allegations of rules violations committed by Gottfried and his staff.

References

Cal State Northridge

Cal State Northridge Matadors men's basketball coaches